Forró is a village in Borsod-Abaúj-Zemplén County in northeastern Hungary. , the village had a population of 2,459. A large Bronze Age hoard was discovered at the village in the 19th century. The treasure is now in the collections of the British Museum, London.

See also
Zsujta for another Bronze Age hoard from northern Hungary
Paks-Dunaföldvár gold hoard from the Bronze Age

References

Populated places in Borsod-Abaúj-Zemplén County